Zhang Lei (born 1982) is a Chinese football referee. He is a full international referee for FIFA.

On 23 February 2019, it was announced that Zhang Lei had been hired by CFA to become one of the professional referees in China.

References 

Chinese football referees
Living people
1982 births
Sportspeople from Dalian